Luka Ivanishvili (born 25 November 2001 in Georgia) is a Georgian rugby union player who plays for  in the 2022 Currie Cup First Division. His playing position is flanker or number 8. He was named in the  squad for the 2022 Currie Cup First Division. He has also represented Georgia internationally.

Reference list

External links
itsrugby.co.uk profile

2001 births
Living people
Rugby union flankers
Rugby union number eights
The Black Lion players
Rugby union players from Georgia (country)
Georgia international rugby union players